Flat is an unincorporated community in Wolfe County, Kentucky, United States. The Flat post office was established in 1892. Its post office  has since been discontinued.

The origin of the name "Flat" is obscure.

References

Unincorporated communities in Wolfe County, Kentucky
Unincorporated communities in Kentucky